Carl de Vogt (14 September 1885 – 16 February 1970) was a German film actor who starred in four of Fritz Lang's early films. He attended the acting school in Cologne, Germany. Together with acting he was also active as a singer and recorded several discs. His greatest hit was "Der Fremdenlegionär". An extremely successful actor in his early career, he died in relative obscurity in 1970.

In 1919 and 1920, de Vogt starred in director Fritz Lang's two-part Spiders films opposite actresses Lil Dagover and Ressel Orla. In 1932, in the early sound era, he played the Prussian hero Major Schill in the big-budget historical film The Eleven Schill Officers.

De Vogt was married to the German film actress Cläre Lotto, and the couple had a son Karl Franz de Vogt (born 14 May 1917). He was a member of the NSDAP and the Sturmabteilung.

Selected filmography

 Schwert und Herd (1916) as Schmied Wilhelm Trautmann
 Friedrich Werders Sendung (1916) as Friedrich Werder
 Die Einsame (1916)
 Der Knute entflohen (1917) as Bräutigam Walter Fuchs
 When the Dead Speak (1917) as Edgar von Radowitz
 Ahasver (1917, part 1-3) as Ahasver
 Erloschene Augen. Tragödie eines blinden Kindes (1917)
 Der Herr der Welt (1918)
 The Path of Death (1918) as Graf
 Olaf Bernadotte (1918)
 Kassenrevision (1918)
 Die Beichte des Mönchs (1918)
 Der Mann im Monde (1918)
 Das Licht des Lebens (1918)
 Halbblut (1919) as Axel van der Straaten
 Der Herr der Liebe (1919) as Vasile Disecu
 The Spiders (1919-1920, part 1, 2) as Kay Hoog
 Vom Rande des Sumpfes (1919) as Ingenieur Erich Romberg
 The Woman with Orchids (1919)
 The Tragedy of a Great (1920) as Rembrandt
 On the Brink of Paradise (1920) as Kara Ben Nemsi
 The Black Tulip Festival (1920) as Adrian Witt
 Caravan of Death (1920) as Kara Ben Nemsi
 Humanity Unleashed (1920) as Winterstein, Karenows Mitarbeiter
 The Devil Worshippers (1921) as Kara Ben Nemsi
 The Thirteen of Steel (1921) as Frank Steen
 Planetenschieber (1921)
 The Oath of Stephan Huller (1921)
 The Lord of the Beasts (1921)
 Die Schreckensnacht in der Menagerie (1921)
 The Poisoned Stream (1921) as Pirat Nr. 25
 Unter Räubern und Bestien (1921)
 Aus dem Schwarzbuch eines Polizeikommissars (1921, part 2)
 Die Schatzkammer im See (1921, part 1, 2) as Harry Wills / Bill Jackson
 Acht Uhr dreizehn - Das Geheimnis des Deltaklubs (1921) as Fred Hobbing
 The Tigress (1922)
 Alone in the Jungle (1922), as Engineer Gyldendal as Ingenieur Gyldendal
 Die Kleine vom Film (1922) as Van der Heyt
 Matrosenliebste (1922)
 The White Desert (1922) as Sigurd
 The Mute of Portici (1922) as Masaniello, a Neapolitan fisherman
 Wer wirft den ersten Stein (1922) as Goot, Direktor der Tabakfabrik
 Nathan the Wise (1922) as Assad of Filneck / Young Templar 
 Liebes-List und -Lust (1922) as Dioneo / Bertram / Pyrries
 Demon Circus (1923)
 Explosion (1923)
 Lachendes Weinen (1923)
 Helena (1924) as Hector
 The Game of Love (1924) as Georg, Ingenieur
 The Terror of the Sea (1924)
 The Blonde Hannele (1924) as Walter Bergson
 Prater (1924) as Martin, seaman
 The Four Last Seconds of Quidam Uhl (1924) as Quidam Uhl
 Ballettratten (1925) as König
 Die Europameisterschaft (1925) as Turnvater Jahn
 Durch Sport zum Sieg (1925) as Paul
 Bismarck (1925, part 2) as Napoleon III
 The Girl from America (1925) as Lutz Gutzewitt / Marquis Saintbrillant
 Am besten gefällt mir die Lore (1925) as Carl Funke
 The Poacher (1926) as Werner, gamekeeper
 I Once Had a Comrade (1926) as Oberleutnant Hellmuth von Khaden
 The Secret of St. Pauli (1926)
 Schützenliesel (1926) as Konrad Sturm, Forstadjunkt
 The Song of Life (1926) as Richard Marschall
 Bismarck 1862–1898 (1927) as Napoleon III
 Stolzenfels am Rhein (1927) as Wenzel von Geyr
 U-9 Weddigen (1927) as Weddingen
 Linden Lady on the Rhine (1927) as Doctor Allertag
 The Curse of Vererbung (1927) as Doctor Münchow
 The Beggar from Cologne Cathedral (1927) as The beggar
 The Merry Vineyard (1927) as Jochen Most
 Endangered Girls (1927)
 Dame Care (1928) as Baron Douglas
 Master and Mistress (1928) as Robert
 Escape (1928) as Kölling
 Number 17 (1928) as Gilbert Fordyce
 Behind Monastery Walls (1928) as Friar Meinrad
 Waterloo (1929) as Marshal Ney
 Dawn (1929) as Bernhard Eggebrecht
 Andreas Hofer (1929) as Josef Eisenstecken
 The Veil Dancer (1929)
 Disgrace (1929) as JUDr. Holan
 Three Days of Life and Death (1929) as The submarine commander
 Rag Ball (1930) as Dr. Wiegand - Rechtsanwalt
 Flachsmann the Educator (1930) as Vogelsang
 Der Fleck auf der Ehr''' (1930) as Hubmayer, ein Landstreicher
 Die Frau - Die Nachtigall (1931) as Ein Offizier
 Das Geheimnis der roten Katze (1931)
 Teilnehmer antwortet nicht (1932) as Kommissär Buhlke
 The Eleven Schill Officers (1932) as Ferdinand von Schill
 The Dancer of Sanssouci (1932) as Pesne
 Trenck (1932) as Duke of Württemberg
 Song of the Black Mountains (1933) as Windolf
 A Song Goes Round the World (1933) as Theaterdirektor
 Die Nacht der großen Liebe (1933) as The Captain
 Schüsse an der Grenze (1933)
 Wenn am Sonntagabend die Dorfmusik spielt (1933) as Fritz Wendhofer, Gutsverwalter
 Weiße Majestät (1933) as Bundesrichter Dr. Reymond
 Liebesfrühling (1933)
 William Tell (1934) as Konrad Baumgarten
 Elisabeth und der Narr (1934)
 At the Strasbourg (1934) as Konrad Pfister, Sohn
 I for You, You for Me (1934) as Kollerbuch
 Fährmann Maria (1936) as The Minstrel
 If We All Were Angels (1936) as hotel porter
 Musketier Meier III (1938) as Unteroffizier Macke
 Rheinische Brautfahrt (1939) as Rechtsanwalt Dr. Vollbrecht
 Torreani (1951)
 Mailman Mueller (1953)
 The Seven Dresses of Katrin (1954)
 Die Ratten (1955)
 My Leopold (1955)
 Banktresor 713 (1957) as Älterer Mann
 Blind Justice (1961) as Beisitzender Richter (uncredited)
 Das Geheimnis der schwarzen Koffer (1962) as Patient (uncredited)
 Die unsichtbaren Krallen des Dr. Mabuse (1962) as Empfangschef
 The Strangler of Blackmoor Castle'' (1963) as Doctor

External links
 
 Fan page
 Biography
 Filmography and a large collection of photos
 Photographs of Carl de Vogt

1885 births
1970 deaths
Actors from Cologne
People from the Rhine Province
Nazi Party members
German male film actors
German male silent film actors
20th-century German male actors
Sturmabteilung personnel